Mirande is a commune in the Gers department, Occitania, southwestern France.

Geography

Population

Sites of interest 
 Town Hall
 St. Mary's Cathedral
 Astarac Square
 Clock Tower
 Rohan Tower

Leisure activities
 Aquapark "Ludina"

Events
 Country Music Festival
 Traditional markets

See also
 Communes of the Gers department

References

External links

 

Communes of Gers
Subprefectures in France
Armagnac